Iceland competed at the 1952 Summer Olympics in Helsinki, Finland.

Results by event

Athletics

Men
Track & road events

Field events

References
Official Olympic Reports

The Summer Olympic games held in Helsinki, Finland lasted from July 19 until August 3 of 1952. There were 69 countries represented and 4,955 athletes competing in 149 events.

Iceland delegated nine male athletes for eleven contests. It was only the fifth participation in the Olympic Summer Games for Iceland. Listed below are the names of each athlete and their contributions: 
Ásmundur Bjarnason 100 Meter Dash
200 Meter Dash
4 x 100 -meter sprint
Torfi Bryngeirsson pole vault
Fridrik Gudmundsson discus
Hörður Haraldsson 100 Meter Dash
200 Meter Dash
4 x 100 -meter sprint
Kristján Jóhannsson 5,000 meter run
Guðmundur Lárusson 400 Meter Dash
800 Meter Dash
Þorsteinn Löve discus
Pétur Sigurðsson 100 Meter Dash
4 x 100 -meter sprint
Ingi Þorsteinsson 110 Meter Hurdles
400 Meter Hurdles
4 x 100 -meter sprint

Mr. Ben-G. Waage served for Iceland on the International Olympic Committee.

Notes

Nations at the 1952 Summer Olympics
1952
Summer Olympics